Wang Shuo (born  August 23, 1958) is a Chinese author, director, actor, and cultural icon. He has written over 20 novels, television series and movies. His work has been translated into Japanese, Spanish, French, English, Italian, Hindi, and many other languages. He has enormous cultural status in China and has become a nationally celebrated author.

Background
Wang Shuo grew up in an army compound in Beijing. His family was of Manchu ancestry. When he was an adolescent, his parents were sent to the countryside as part of the Cultural Revolution, leaving him and his brother alone in Beijing among other children whose parents were also away. He joined the navy as a medical assistant where he spent four years. He later pursued a career as a writer. Many lines from his works have become popular slang. Recently, Wang turned down an offer from Francis Ford Coppola's production company. In 2007, Wang Shuo became active once again and went on many talk shows. His latest novel earned at three dollars per character (?), a total of 3.65 million RMB. This was a record high in Chinese publishing history.

Reception and controversy
Despite the frequent controversies surrounding him, Wang Shuo is widely considered to be one of China's most popular and easily recognizable authors, and has been applauded by literary critics.

The New York Times Book Review contributor Sheryl WuDunn compares Wang to Western literary figures such as Joseph Heller, and Kurt Vonnegut, going so far as to label Wang "China's Kerouac." Chinese author Dai Qing has been quoted as describing Wang Shuo as "one of the finest contemporary writers, someone who can use wit and language to betray several decades of ideology that have been forced upon us, but the Government doesn't fear him because while he destroys, he doesn't create or build. And he is willing to compromise with the Government." Historian Christopher Rea argues that Wang's devil-may-care persona and advocacy of wan'r (playing, messing around) echoes the playful, and at times cynical, tone of some early twentieth-century Chinese literature.

Wang Shuo is described by some traditional Chinese critics as a 'spiritual pollutant' for his hooligan style of writing. His work describes the culturally confused generation after the Cultural Revolution, marked by rebellious behavior. During the 90's Wang Shuo was the most popular and famous writer in China. Despite his hooligan style, his collected works were never banned and only one film based on his novels was not allowed to be shown in China until 2004, not because of his political stance, but rather due to his style. Wang Shuo is a national bestseller in China and has influenced generations of Chinese readers. With over 20 novels and 10 million copies in print, Wang Shuo's influence ranges from students to workers, and from drifters to intellectuals. His works mark the beginning of a new writing style in China, influencing many new authors. His satire is less of a direct confrontation with the Communist autocracy than it is a mockery of their lack of cool and a statement of utter indifference to any political or nationalistic correctness.

Many of Wang Shuo's works have been officially banned within the People's Republic of China. Chinese authorities have labelled Wang's works as being "vulgar" and "reactionary" culminating in a four volume collection being officially censored, and removed two TV series which he wrote. 

In his writing style, Wang Shuo has focused on the "living language" which is spoken by ordinary people in the street. He has also used a lot of the Beijing dialect, which makes his works very vivid and attractive.

Works

Novels
 Stewardess 《空中小姐》(1984)
 Hot and Cold, Measure for Measure 《一半是火焰，一半是海水》 (1986年)
 Masters of Mischief, or The Operators 《顽主》 (1987)
 Samsara 《轮回》 (1988)
 Playing for Thrills 《玩儿的就是心跳》 (1989)
 No Regrets About Youth 《青春无悔》 (1991)
 The Vanished Woman 《消失的女人》 (1993)
 Gone Forever with My Love 《永失我爱》 (1994)
 Please Don't Call Me Human 《千万别把我当人》 (1989)
 A Conversation With Our Daughter 《和我们的女儿谈话》(2008)

Filmography

As director
 Father (2000)

Screenplays
 The Troubleshooters (1988)
 Samsara (1988)
 No Regrets About Youth (1991)
 In the Heat of the Sun (1994) - based on the novel Wild Beast
 Father (2000) - based on the novel Wo shi ni baba(《我是你爸爸》 I am your papa)
 Love the Hard Way (2001) - based on the novel Yi Ban Shi Huo Yan, Yi Ban Shi Hai Shui(《一半是火焰，一半是海水》Half flame, half sea water)
 I Love You (2002)
 Little Red Flowers (2006) - based on novel "Could be Beautiful"
 Dreams May Come (2006)
 Personal Tailor (2013)

References

External links

Film directors from Jiangsu
Screenwriters from Jiangsu
1958 births
Manchu people
Living people
Artists from Nanjing
Writers from Nanjing
Chinese male novelists
Male actors from Nanjing